Milan Trajkov Stoilov (1881–1903) was a socialist revolutionary from the region of Macedonia. According to Macedonian historians, he was a Macedonian activist. However according to Bulgarian historians, he is regarded as a Bulgarian revolutionary.

Biography 
Born in Kilkis, then in the Ottoman Empire, Stoilov graduated from the town's Bulgarian primary school and junior high school in 1892 and in 1895, respectively. In 1902, he graduated from the Bulgarian Theological Seminary in Constantinople. That year, he began his studies at the Saint Petersburg Military Medical Academy. In Saint Petersburg, he participated in the Secret Macedonian-Adrianople Circle, which was an offshoot of the Supreme Macedonian-Adrianople Committee. Stoilov was a member of the Macedonian Scientific and Literary Society and served as its secretary. He was involved in the third official act of the Society, which included documenting minutes of its 29 December 1902 session.

In 1903, he left Russia to join the Ilinden Uprising against the Ottomans. In July, he arrived in Sofia and presented himself as a volunteer at the Overseas Representation of the IMARO, from where he was assigned to a detachment going to Ottoman Macedonia under Nikola Dechev. Stoilov headed a medical squad. He was killed in a fighting in Orizari, near Kočani, on 5 September 1903. According to other reports, he was heavily wounded and captured by the Turks and died in prison in Kočani in 1904. As a socialist-internationalist, he claimеd that he was not going to die for a certain nation or as a patriot, but as a revolutionary fighting for the good of humanity.

Stoilov also authored "The Kilkis Vampire" ("Кукушкият вампир"), a didactic novel written in Bulgarian.

Notes

References

1881 births
1903 deaths
Early Macedonists
People from Kilkis
Macedonian Scientific and Literary Society
Bulgarian revolutionaries